Monnerville is a surname. Notable people with the surname include:

 Gaston Monnerville (1897–1991), French politician and lawyer
 Jean-Marc Monnerville (born 1959), birth name of French musician Kali
 Pierre Monnerville (1895–1970), French politician